Wawatam Township is a civil township of Emmet County in the U.S. state of Michigan.  As of the 2010 census, the township population was 661.

The village of Mackinaw City is located mostly within the township.

The township is named after Wawatam, an Odawa chief noted for rescuing British trader Alexander Henry the elder from the Ojibwas' capture of Fort Michilimackinac in 1763.

Communities
Mackinaw City is also located in the northeast portion of Mackinaw Township. I-75 runs through Mackinaw City, and the southern end of the Mackinac Bridge is located in the village.

Geography
The township contains a large inland lake, French Farm Lake.

Demographics
As of the census of 2000, there were 705 people, 329 households, and 207 families residing in the township. The racial makeup of the township was 94.33% White, 0.28% African American, 4.40% Native American, 0.14% Asian, and 0.85% from two or more races. Hispanic or Latino of any race were 0.85% of the population.

There were 329 households, out of which 23.1% had children under the age of 18 living with them, 52.9% were married couples living together, 7.3% had a female householder with no husband present, and 36.8% were non-families. 31.9% of all households were made up of individuals, and 16.4% had someone living alone who was 65 years of age or older.  The average household size was 2.14 and the average family size was 2.66.

In the township the population was spread out, with 20.4% under the age of 18, 4.5% from 18 to 24, 24.0% from 25 to 44, 29.1% from 45 to 64, and 22.0% who were 65 years of age or older.  The median age was 46 years. For every 100 females, there were 90.0 males.  For every 100 females age 18 and over, there were 85.8 males.

The median income for a household in the township was $35,909, and the median income for a family was $46,875. Males had a median income of $32,188 versus $30,536 for females. The per capita income for the township was $19,525.  About 5.1% of families and 7.5% of the population were below the poverty line, including 13.0% of those under age 18 and 1.4% of those age 65 or over.

Notes

External links
 Wawatam Township website: https://www.wawatamtownship.org/

Townships in Emmet County, Michigan
Townships in Michigan
Populated places established in 1923
1923 establishments in Michigan
Michigan populated places on Lake Michigan